2nd Earl of Bristol may refer to:

George Digby, 2nd Earl of Bristol (1612–1677)
George William Hervey, 2nd Earl of Bristol (1721–1775)

See also
Earl of Bristol